Afarin Sajedi (born 1979) is an Iranian artist from Shiraz. Her artworks predominantly features women merged with a variety of animals or objects. Her works have been exhibited most frequently in Iran, London, and Italy.

Early life 
Sajedi was born in 1979 in Shiraz, Iran. She graduated from Islamic Azad University, Central Tehran Branch in 2004 with a degree in graphic design, with a background in animation and illustration.

Career 
Sajedi's career has primarily revolved around her artworks of women. Anya Tchoupakov of VICE described Sajedi's works as "mostly of women, taking on different faces, thrust into various roles, merging into animals, objects, and each other." Sajedi has stated that she tries to capture human presence and issues within her works, and that her inspiration includes paintings of humans from the Renaissance.

Between 2001 and 2012, Sajedi showcased works in several solo and group exhibits in Iran. In 2012, Sajedi had her first international showing at Palazzo Valentini in Rome in a Dorothy Circus Gallery group exhibit titled "Inside Her Eyes." The following year, Sajedi exhibited again in Rome at the Dorothy Circus Gallery in a four-person exhibit titled "God is Her Deejay." She also exhibited at the Flower Pepper Gallery in Pasadena, California, and the Žitný Ostrov Múzeum in Slovakia.

In 2015, Sajedi was invited by Cité internationale des arts in Paris for a three-month residency. She also hosted a solo exhibition, "The Unseen", at Etemed Gallery in Tehran. From April 16 to May 30, 2016, Sajedi exhibited at Dorothy Circus Gallery in Rome once again in a solo exhibit titled "Illusion." In 2019, Sajedi had another solo exhibition again with Dorothy Circus Gallery in London.

In 2020, during the COVID-19 pandemic, fans from a number of countries posted photos of themselves dressed as Sajedi's paintings. In a Shargh Daily interview, Sajedi mentioned that several museums had challenged people to recreate artworks in real life, and gradually she found more and more people sharing recreations of her work on Facebook and Instagram. From July 30 to September 18, Sajedi was part of Dorothy Circus Gallery's "House of the Rising Light" group exhibition of 42 artists from Asia.

References

External links 
 

Iranian women artists
People from Shiraz
1979 births
Living people